Frits de Graaf (10 May 1926 – 30 August 1998) was a Dutch footballer. He played in three matches for the Netherlands national football team in 1950.

References

External links
 

1926 births
1998 deaths
Dutch footballers
Netherlands international footballers
Place of birth missing
Association footballers not categorized by position